Lope III Ximénez de Urrea y de Bardaixi, Viceroy of Sicily, fought during the Italian Wars and was involved in the Conquest of Naples, Italy.

Family
His first marriage was to Beatriz Ruiz de Liori. He later married Catalina de Centelles  y de Cabrera. They had two children:
1) Beatriz Ximenez de Urrea y de Centelles who married Francisco Gilabert de Centelles y Queralt, her cousin; and
2) Lope IV Ximénez de Urrea y de Centelles, 1st Count of Aranda.

External links
http://www.grandesp.org.uk/historia/gzas/aranda.htm
http://www.euskomedia.org/PDFAnlt/riev/03046062.pdf
http://es.wikilingue.com/fr/G%C3%A9n%C3%A9alogie_general_de_los_Cap%C3%A9tiens
http://es.wikilingue.com/fr/G%C3%A9n%C3%A9alogie_general_de_los_Cap%C3%A9tiens#Evreux-Navarra

Viceroys of Naples
Viceroys of Sicily
Spanish untitled nobility
15th-century people from the Kingdom of Aragon